Rei is both a Japanese given name and a Hebrew given name. In Hebrew, the name Rei (רעי Re`iY) originates in biblical texts which mean "my shepherd; my companion; my friend". In Japanese it could have different meanings depending on the used kanji. The word 'Rei' can be used for (or by) either gender.

Possible Japanese writings
麗, "lovely, graceful, beautiful"
霊, "spirit, ghost, departed soul"
例, "example, custom, usage, usual"
零, "zero"
玲, "exquisite, clever, sound of jewels"
令, "rule, order, command"
礼, "etiquette, bow, gratitude"
怜, "wise"
鈴, "small bell"
嶺, "peak, summit, mountain top"
黎, "black, dark, many"
澪, "water route, shipping canal"
励, "encourage, inspire"
伶, "actor"
苓, "plant, herb, mushroom"
禮, "manners, social custom, honor"
齢, "age"
冷, "cool, chill"
蛎, "oyster"
砺, "whetstone, polish"
戻, "return, resume, go backwards"
蠣, "oyster"
レイ, Rei written in katakana
れい, Rei written in hiragana

People with the name
Rei Dan (檀れい, born 1971), actress
Ray Fujita (藤田玲, born 1988), actor
Rei Gesing (born 1973), german author
Rei Hiroe (広江 礼威, born 1972), manga artist
Rei Igarashi (大濱 貴子, born 1963), actress and voice actress
Rei Kawakubo (川久保 玲, born 1942), fashion designer, founder of Comme des Garçons
Rei Kikukawa (菊川 怜, born 1978), actress, model and television presenter
Rei Mikamoto (三家本 礼, born 1974), horror manga artist 
Rei Nakano (中野澪, born 1999), actor
Rei Okamoto (岡本玲, born 1991), model and actress
Rei Omishi (臣士れい, born 19--),  screenwriter and manga author/artist
Rei Otori (大鳥れい, born 1973), actress
Rei Sakuma (佐久間 レイ, born 1965), voice actor
, Japanese badminton player
, Japanese motorcycle racer
, Japanese baseball player
Rei Takedomi, Japanese shogi player
Rei Yoshii (吉井怜, born 1992), actress
Rei Naoi (直井怜, born 2004), singer, rapper

Other people
Rei Berroa (born 1949), Dominican-American poet, university professor, literary and cultural critic, and translator

Fictional characters
Rei (Breath of Fire character), a character in the video game Breath of Fire III
Rei (Fist of the North Star character), a character in the manga series Fist of the North Star
Rei, a character in the video game Ōkami
Rei, a character in the video game Persona Q: Shadow of the Labyrinth
Rei (Urusei Yatsura), a character in the manga series Urusei Yatsura
Rei Amayado, a character in the multimedia project  Hypnosis Mic: Division Rap Battle  
Rei Ayanami, a character in the media franchise Neon Genesis Evangelion
Rei Furuya, a character in the manga series Detective Conan
Rei Hasekura, a character in the light novel series Maria-sama ga Miteru
Rei Hino, a character in the anime and manga series Sailor Moon
Rei Hizuki, a character in the anime series Sky Girls
Rei Hōōmaru, a character in the anime series Kill la Kill
Rei Houjou, a character in the manga series Mirai Nikki
Rei Kashino, a character in the manga and drama series Mars
Rei Katsura, a character in the anime series Digimon Universe: Appli Monsters
Rei Kiriyama, protagonist of the manga series March Comes in Like a Lion
Rei Kizaki, a character in the anime series Aikatsu Stars!
Rei Kohmyoji, a character in the OVA series Kikaider 01: The Animation
Rei Kon, a character in the anime series Beyblade
Rei Kurosawa, a character in the video game series Fatal Frame
Rei Mekaru (銘苅 冷), the Ultimate Professor, from Danganronpa Another Despair Academy
Rei Miyamoto, a character in the manga series Highschool of the Dead
Rei Ogami, a character in the anime and manga series Code:Breaker
Rei Ryghts, a character in the video game Hyperdimension Neptunia Victory
Rei Ryugazaki, a character in the anime series Free!
Rei Sagara, a character in the anime and manga series Love Stage!!
Rei Sakuma, a character in the Ensemble Stars series
Rei Saotome (早乙女レイ)(Blair Flannigan), a character in the anime series Yu-Gi-Oh! GX
Rei Shimizu (志水礼), a character in the video game series Danganronpa
Rei Suwa (諏訪零), a character in the anime Buddy Daddies
Rei Suzumura, a character in the tokusatsu series Garo
Rei Suzuya, a character in the manga series Tokyo Ghoul
Rei Tachibana, a character in the tokusatsu series Kagaku Sentai Dynaman
Rei Takashima, a character in the manga series Deadman Wonderland
, a character in the manga series My Hero Academia
Rei Toei, a character in the novel series Bridge trilogy
Rei Wakana, a character in the media franchise BanG Dream!
, a character in the manga/anime Kakegurui

References 

Japanese unisex given names